Mount Wilson is a mountain rising in the west part of the Bermel Peninsula on the Bowman Coast of Antarctica. This mountain appears indistinctly in a photograph taken by Sir Hubert Wilkins on his flight of December 20, 1928. The feature was rephotographed in 1935 by Lincoln Ellsworth and in 1947 by RARE under Ronne. It was surveyed by the Falkland Islands Dependencies Survey in 1948. Named by Ronne after Major General R. C. Wilson, chief of staff to Lt. General Curtis LeMay, head of the Office of Research and Development of the then Army Air Force, which furnished equipment for RARE.

References

Mountains of Graham Land
Bowman Coast